Rhodanobacter caeni is a Gram-negative and motile bacterium from the genus of Rhodanobacter which has been isolated from sewage sludge from Daejeon in Korea.

References

Xanthomonadales
Bacteria described in 2012